The Contura  was a line of notebook computers produced by Compaq. Released in 1992, the Contura was Compaq's first attempt at making an affordable, entry-level laptop computer.

Contura series 

The main Contura series included models 3/20, 3/25, 3/25c, 4/25, 4/25c, 4/25cx, 400, 400C, 400CX, 410, 410C, 410CX, 420C, 420CX, 430C, and 430CX.  These were standard-size notebooks, not ultra-portable subnotebook computers. The "X" designation denoted an active matrix screen.

3/20 
 386SL running at 20 MHz
 Display: VGA monochrome
 RAM: 2 MB
 40 MB or 84 MB hard disk
 External trackball attached to the side of the laptop

3/25c 
 386SL running at 25 MHz
 Display: VGA color
 RAM: 4 MB
 80 MB or 120 MB hard disk
 External trackball attached to the side of the laptop

4/25 
 486SL running at 25 MHz
 Display: VGA monochrome
 RAM: 4 MB
 120 MB or 200 MB hard disk
 External trackball attached to the side of the laptop

4/25c 
 486SL running at 25 MHz
 Display: VGA color
 RAM: 4 MB
 120 MB or 200 MB hard disk
 External trackball attached to the side of the laptop

4/25cx 
 486SL running at 25 MHz
 Display: VGA color (active matrix) 
 RAM: 4 MB
 120 MB or 200 MB hard disk
 Integrated trackball

Contura Aero series 
The Compaq Contura Aero 4/25 and 4/33c were among the earliest subnotebook computers that acted as a precursor to netbooks. They were released in 1994 and originally ran MS-DOS and Windows 3.1. They were also able to run Windows 95 after its release in 1995. They were similar to the Armada line of laptop computers, but smaller. Although the 4/25's GPU can produce color, the datasheet for the device states it is incapable of producing color graphics. This does not apply to the 4/33c.

4/25 
 i486SX-S (SL enhanced 486SX) running at 25 MHz
 Display: Passive matrix gray scale VGA (16 shades (640x480) high resolution, 64 shades (320x200) low resolution, color capable when using an external VGA monitor)
 RAM: 4 MB built-in (expandable to a maximum of 8 MB or 12 MB using an optional 4 or 8MB Compaq branded module, or 20 MB using a third party 16 MB module)
 256 KB video memory (512 KB exists in the system, but is not accessible by the GPU.)
 84 MB, 170 MB or 250 MB 2.5" IDE hard disk drive
 1 PCMCIA slot (Type II)
 1 ECP/EPP 1.9 capable parallel port
 1 RS-232 serial port (16550 UART)
 1.5 x 10.25 x 7.5 inches (3.8 x 26 x 19 cm)
 Integrated trackball

4/33c 

 i486SX-S (SL enhanced 486SX) running at 33 MHz
 Display: Passive matrix color VGA (16 colors (640x480) high resolution, 256 colors (320x200) low resolution)
 RAM: 4 MB built-in (expandable to a maximum of 8 or 12 MB using an optional 4 MB or 8 MB Compaq branded module, or 20 MB using a third party 16 MB module)
 256 KB video memory (512 KB exists in the system, but is not accessible by the GPU.)
 84 MB, 170 MB or 250 MB 2.5" IDE hard disk drive
 1 PCMCIA slot (Type II)
 1 ECP/EPP 1.9 capable parallel port
 1 RS-232 serial port (16550 UART)
 1.7 x 10.25 x 7.5 inches (4.3 x 26 x 19 cm)
 Integrated trackball

Aero handhelds 
 Compaq Aero 1500 Palm-size PC
 Compaq Aero 2100 Color Palm-size PC
 Compaq Aero 8000 Handheld PC Pro

This line of notebook PCs from Compaq was first succeeded by the Compaq C-Series and then by the Aero 1550 Pocket PC. The line of handheld devices starting from the Aero 1550 Pocket PC were finally moulded into the iPAQ line of handheld devices, which was handled by Hewlett-Packard, after their acquisition of Compaq.

In popular culture 
 The Compaq Contura 4/25cx was used and seen in the 1995 Season 2, Episode 8 of Friends.
 The Compaq Contura 4/33c was used and seen in the 2000 Season 4, Episode 4 of La Femme Nikita.

References 

Contura
Windows CE devices
Computer-related introductions in 1992